Joann Glasson (born 1946) is a North American champion bridge player and an American Contract Bridge League (ACBL) Grand Life Master.

Bridge accomplishments

Wins
 North American Bridge Championships (8)
 Machlin Women's Swiss Teams (2) 2008, 2013 
 Wagar Women's Knockout Teams (3) 1994, 2009, 2013 
 Whitehead Women's Pairs (1) 2009
 Sternberg Women's Board-a-Match Teams (1) 2012
 Truscott Senior Swiss Teams (1) 2017

Runners-up
 North American Bridge Championships (3)
 Whitehead Women's Pairs (1) 2012
 Sternberg Women's Board-a-Match Teams (1) 1996
 Freeman Mixed Board-a-Match (1) 2002

References

External links
 

American contract bridge players
Living people
1946 births